William Lowther, 2nd Earl of Lonsdale, PC, FRS (21 July 1787 – 4 March 1872), styled Viscount Lowther between 1807 and 1844, was a British Tory politician.

Background
Lonsdale was the eldest son of William Lowther, 1st Earl of Lonsdale, and Lady Augusta, daughter of John Fane, 9th Earl of Westmorland. Henry Lowther was his younger brother. He was educated at Harrow and Trinity College, Cambridge.

Political career

Lonsdale was returned to parliament for Cockermouth in 1808, a seat he held until 1813, and later represented Westmorland between 1813 and 1831 and 1832 and 1841, Dunwich in 1832 and West Cumberland between 1832 and 1833. He was sworn of the Privy Council in 1818 and served under the Duke of Wellington as First Commissioner of Woods and Forests between 1828 and 1830 and under Sir Robert Peel as Treasurer of the Navy and Vice-President of the Board of Trade between 1834 and 1835.

In 1841 he was summoned to the House of Lords through a writ of acceleration in his father's junior title of Baron Lowther and held office under Peel as Postmaster General between 1841 and 1845. In 1844 he succeeded his father in the earldom of Lonsdale. He held his last ministerial office as Lord President of the Council, with a seat in the cabinet, in 1852, in the Earl of Derby's first administration.
  
Lonsdale was elected a Fellow of the Royal Society on 5 July 1810. He was also Lord Lieutenant of Cumberland and Westmorland between 1844 and 1868.

Personal life
Lord Lonsdale never married, but had at least three illegitimate children he acknowledged. He left them substantial sums in his will. An opera enthusiast, it is believed all of his children were born to opera singers or dancers. His daughter with Caroline Saintfal, Marie Caroline, was born in Paris in 1818. Recently it has been discovered that he had Robert Lowther out of wedlock (1816-1895) Mother: Rose Lowther (1796-1828)

Another daughter born the same year, Frances Lowther ("Fanny" to the family, 1818–1890), was registered as the daughter of "Narcisse Chassepomp", in fact Pierre-Narcisse Chaspoux, formerly a dancer at the Paris Opera and then in London, who in 1821 gave birth to the artist Charles Meryon. Frances (Fanny) married Henry Broadwood MP (1793–1878, of the piano-making family), and was the mother of Brig-Gen. Arthur Broadwood (1848–1928). With Emilia Cresotti, an Italian opera singer, he fathered Francis William Lowther (1841–1908), who was the father of Claude Lowther MP and Toupie Lowther.

He died in his London house at 15 Carlton House Terrace on 4 March 1872, aged 84, and was succeeded in the earldom and to Lowther Castle by his nephew, Henry. On the day he died he waited in his carriage outside a London auction house, while an agent bid on his behalf on some lots of porcelain. Of an estate valued at £700,000 (without the entailed land), Francis William and Fanny were bequeathed £125,000 each, and Francis's son £25,000.

A marble bust of him was sculpted by Edward Bowring Stephens, now in the National Trust collection at Hughenden Manor, Buckinghamshire.

References

Collins, Roger, Charles Meryon: A Life, 1999, Garton & Company, 9780906030356

External links 
 

1787 births
1872 deaths
People educated at Harrow School
Alumni of Trinity College, Cambridge
People from Cumberland
British racehorse owners and breeders
Lowther, William Lowther, Viscount
Lowther, William Lowther, Viscount
2
Fellows of the Royal Society
Lord-Lieutenants of Cumberland
Lord-Lieutenants of Westmorland
Lord Presidents of the Council
Lords of the Admiralty
Members of the Privy Council of the United Kingdom
Lowther, William Lowther, Viscount
United Kingdom Postmasters General
Lowther, William Lowther, Viscount
Lowther, William Lowther, Viscount
Lowther, William Lowther, Viscount
Lowther, William Lowther, Viscount
Lowther, William Lowther, Viscount
Lowther, William Lowther, Viscount
Lowther, William Lowther, Viscount
Lowther, William Lowther, Viscount
Lowther, William Lowther, Viscount
Lowther, William Lowther, Viscount
Cumberland and Westmorland Antiquarian and Archaeological Society
Lonsdale, E2
William
People from Westmorland